Terence Richard Bartlett (born 30 August 1948) is an English former footballer who played as a winger.

References

1948 births
Living people
People from Cleethorpes
English footballers
Association football wingers
Grimsby Town F.C. players
Dartford F.C. players
Immingham Town F.C. players
English Football League players